Undercover is an album of cover versions and remixes by Ministry & Co-Conspirators released on December 6, 2010 by Al Jourgensen's record label 13th Planet Records. The album includes remixes and re-recorded versions of previously released songs such as "N.W.O.", "Stigmata", and "Jesus Built My Hotrod", among others. Every Day Is Halloween: The Anthology, which was released October 5 by Cleopatra Records, features almost all of the same songs with the exception of their cover of Black Sabbath's "Paranoid", which is only available on this album.

Track listing

Personnel
Alien Jourgensen - vocals, bass (2, 3, 5, 7, 8, 11, 12), keyboards (1, 5, 11, 12, 13), rhythm guitar (4, 5), lead guitar (5), mandolin (7, 12), slide Solo (8, 9), horn arrangements (10), production
Mike Scaccia - rhythm guitar (1, 2, 3, 6, 7, 8, 9, 10, 11, 12), lead guitar (1, 2, 3, 6, 7, 8, 9, 10, 11, 12), guitar (13), Classical Guitar (12), bass (1, 6, 10)
Erie Loch - programming (3, 4), add. programming/remix
Sammy D'Ambruoso - drum programming, engineering, background vocals (7, 8)
Andrew Davidson - background vocals (7, 8, 10), programming, assistant engineer
Karma Cheema - background vocals (10), programming, assistant engineer
Liz Constantine - vocals (13)
Paul Raven - bass (13)
Tommy Victor - guitar (13)
Dave Donnelly - mastering
Kade Burt - art direction, design, layout

References

2010 albums
Albums produced by Al Jourgensen
Covers albums
Ministry (band) albums